is a former Japanese football player.

Club statistics
Updated to 23 February 2019.

References

External links

Profile at Grulla Morioka

1992 births
Living people
Association football people from Kumamoto Prefecture
Japanese footballers
J1 League players
J2 League players
J3 League players
Avispa Fukuoka players
Zweigen Kanazawa players
Iwate Grulla Morioka players
Association football defenders